The Punjab Constabulary (Punjabi, Urdu: پنجاب کانسٹیبلری) is a law enforcement agency in Pakistan which is responsible to maintain peace in Punjab Province by assisting Punjab Police. IG Police is the provincial police officer and heads all subordinate police units. Punjab Constabulary is a police unit working under the command of Commandant (Addl: Inspector General of Police). It takes actions to maintain law and order in the province and participate in different rescue operations. Punjab Constabulary is reserve police which provides security to different personalities and guards are deputed at different sensitive buildings all over the Punjab.

Addl: Inspector General of Police, Capt. (R) Muhmmad Ehsan Tuffail, PSP has been appointed the new Commandant of Punjab Constabulary as of 20.07.2018.

History
The District Armed Reserves remained more or less static since independence. Government of Punjab created Punjab Reserve Police in 1972 with the following sanctioned strength:

The strength of PRP was gradually increased from time to time and by 1981 was as under:

In 1982 the strength was enhanced to 5000 with its contingents at Lahore, Rawalpindi, Faisalabad, Multan & Gujranwala.
On 01-02-1987, PRP was renamed as “Punjab Constabulary”. A separate Anti-riot Force was raised as a unit of Punjab Police. The purpose was to build the capacity of police and reduce its dependence on rangers/army.

Later on, the level of command was upgraded from DIG to the Addl: IGP on 27-02-2006.  Now Punjab Constabulary  is a borrowing agency where police officials and officers of different ranks (Constable to Inspector) are received from various districts and regions for a period of 02 years. On completion of 02 years period, they are repatriated to their parent districts/regions subject to provision of substitutes.

ISLAMABAD, June 19, 2007: Around 1,300 personnel of Punjab Constabulary (PC), called to reinforce the Islamabad Capital Territory (ICT) police to handle the Lal Masjid crisis, demonstrated in the Aabpara Chowk on Tuesday in protest against the death of a colleague.

In a major corruption case of Battalion No.3 Punjab constabulary Multan, action was taken against the guilty ones

Organization
The Punjab Constabulary is constituted by the Police Order 2002 and operates under Police Rules of 1934. Regional Police Officers and District Police Officers send demand of PC Force to IGP Punjab Lahore as per prevailing law & order situation. The AIG/Operations CPO Punjab distributes PC Force as per the demand of the Regions/Districts. Therefore, on receipt of the direction/order from CPO Punjab Lahore, the PC Force (Reserves) are dispatched to the concerned Districts for a limited period. Punjab Constabulary has 07 Battalions in different cities and Headquarters is situated in Farooqabad City, District Sheikhupura. Detail of Punjab Constabulary's Battalions is as under:-

Detail of Sanctioned Strength of PC Force is mentioned below:-

Equipment
 Semi-automatic rifle
 Submachine gun
 HK G3 Assault Rifle
 Light machine gun
 MP5A3 SMG
 Beretta 92FS Pistol
 Shotgun 12 Bore
 Sniper rifle
 Starting pistol (Starter Pistol)
 38 Special Rivolver
 Bren light machine gun
 Tear Gas Gun
 Long Range Shell
 Short Range Shell
 Smoke Grenades
 Mortar Gun 60mm
 Morter Gun 40mm
 Tear Gas Mask
 Chemical Mask

Head of Organization
Additional Inspector General of Police is the Commandant of Punjab Constabulary. Hereunder, is the list of Commandants who have served this unit.

See also
 Punjab Police
 Dolphin Force
 Elite Police
 Punjab Prisons (Pakistan)
 Punjab Highway Patrol

References 

Law enforcement agencies of Pakistan
1987 establishments in Pakistan
Punjab, Pakistan